Christian Okonkwo is a Nigerian former footballer who is last known to have played for FC Belize in 2010.

FC Belize

Okonkwo played for FC Belize of the Belize Premier Football League, one of the predecessors to the Premier League of Belize. He was top scorer of the 2010 season, recording 11 goals with 3 scored in the last round in a 6-1 win over Belmopan Blaze in the 21st, 66th and 85th minutes.

References

Nigerian footballers
Nigerian expatriate footballers
Association football forwards
Expatriate footballers in Belize
Living people
Expatriate footballers in Trinidad and Tobago
TT Pro League players
Premier League of Belize players
FC Belize players
Year of birth missing (living people)